The 2021–22 Jackson State Tigers basketball team represented Jackson State University in the 2021–22 NCAA Division I men's basketball season. The Tigers, led by ninth-year head coach Wayne Brent, played their home games at the Williams Assembly Center in Jackson, Mississippi as members of the Southwestern Athletic Conference.

Previous season
The Tigers finished the 2020–21 season 12–6, 11–0 in SWAC play, and were SWAC regular season co-champions alongside Prairie View A&M. In the SWAC tournament, they defeated Arkansas–Pine Bluff in the quarterfinals, but were upset by eventual champions Texas Southern in overtime in the semifinals.

Roster

Schedule and results

|-
!colspan=12 style=| Non-conference regular season

|-
!colspan=12 style=| SWAC regular season

|-
!colspan=9 style=| SWAC tournament

Source

References

Jackson State Tigers basketball seasons
Jackson State Tigers
Jackson State Tigers basketball
Jackson State Tigers basketball